R v Licensing Court of Brisbane; Ex parte Daniell is a High Court of Australia case about inconsistency between Commonwealth and State legislation, which is dealt with by s 109 of the Australian Constitution. It is the leading example of what is known as the impossibility of simultaneous obedience test.

Background 

Section 166 of the Liquor Act 1912 (Qld) stated that a State referendum on liquor trading hours was to be held on the same day as the Senate elections. However, section 14 of the Commonwealth Electoral (Wartime) Act 1917 (Cth) forbid electors from voting at a State referendum or vote on the same day as the Senate elections, which were held on 5 May 1917.

The decision 

It was held that there was an inconsistency between the Queensland and Commonwealth Acts, and thus the State law, to the extent of the inconsistency, is invalid. It is an example of impossibility of simultaneous obedience because had State officials obeyed the State law by conducting the State referendum on 5 May 1917, they would have contravened the Commonwealth law forbidding such an occurrence.

See also 

 Section 109 of the Australian Constitution
 Australian constitutional law

References 

 Winterton, G. et al. Australian federal constitutional law: commentary and materials, 1999. LBC Information Services, Sydney.

High Court of Australia cases
1920 in Australian law
1920 in case law
Australian constitutional law
Inconsistency in the Australian Constitution cases
Referendums in Queensland
Alcohol law in Australia
1920s in Queensland